Pixel Bath is the debut studio album by Mexican-American experimental pop musician Jean Dawson, released on October 23, 2020, by the artist's independent label P+.

Style and reception 

AllMusic's Fred Thomas writes that on the album, Dawson "set out to create the 'soundtrack for a black coming-of-age film that never ends', and accomplishes just that with this collection of nostalgic dream pop melodies caught in perpetual conflicted collision with high-energy rap." The album includes opener "Devilish" which "moves abruptly from bellowed, melodramatic vocals to intense rap flows about monsters, boogie men, and surreal critiques of toxic masculinity" made even more unique by the placement of "his melodically sung lyrics ... over a backdrop of peppy guitars and bass that sounds like Clap Your Hands Say Yeah at their catchiest" and "album standout" "TripleDouble"  "with a Pixies bass line decorated with trap ad-libs and a big rock chorus." Dawson's "wild swings of imagination and daring are so unexpected they can be jarring, but it's this willingness to go outside of the known that puts Pixel Bath in a class by itself."

The Arts Fuses Alex Szeptycki calls the album "a kaleidoscopic melange that vividly reflects the artist's personality and inspirations" and "one of the most compelling releases I've heard this year", with Dawson's "magnetic personality ... infused through the album's excitingly varied instrumentals and bold vocal performances." Per Beats Per Minutes Kyle Kohner, Dawson's "refreshing and exciting" "undefinable alternative hip hop sound" brings "a bit of everything – bedroom pop, pop-punk, industrial rap, and even glitch-pop" to the album, making for a "boisterous marvel to behold, touched through and through with deep emotion." NMEs Jenessa Williams says that "by refusing to limit his musical focus Dawson buys himself a future of authentic experimentation, thrilling the listener with unexpected twists and turns that do, miraculously, offer up something for everyone" and that while "if you really want to find fault in Pixel Bath, you might acknowledge that even the gnarliest of rollercoasters become that little bit less exciting once you've seen their blueprints", "if you're ready to hear what true unbounded creativity sounds like, Jean Dawson can take you on one hell of a ride."

Track listing

Release history

References 

2020 debut albums
Jean Dawson albums
Alternative hip hop albums by American artists
Dream pop albums by American artists